These are the official results of the Men's High Jump event at the 1982 European Championships in Athens, Greece, held at the Olympic Stadium "Spiros Louis" on 10 and 11 September 1982.

Medalists

Results

Final
11 September

Qualification
10 September

Participation
According to an unofficial count, 22 athletes from 13 countries participated in the event.

 (1)
 (2)
 (1)
 (2)
 (2)
 (1)
 (3)
 (2)
 (2)
 (1)
 (1)
 (3)
 (1)

See also
 1978 Men's European Championships High Jump (Prague)
 1980 Men's Olympic High Jump (Moscow)
 1983 Men's World Championships High Jump (Helsinki)
 1984 Men's Olympic High Jump (Los Angeles)
 1986 Men's European Championships High Jump (Stuttgart)
 1987 Men's World Championships High Jump (Rome)
 1988 Men's Olympic High Jump (Seoul)

References

 Results

High jump
High jump at the European Athletics Championships